Jorge Luis Dely Valdés (born March 12, 1967) is a Panamanian former footballer who played as a forward. He is a twin brother of Julio Dely Valdés and younger brother of Armando Dely Valdés.

Club career 
Born in Colon, Dely Valdés began his professional career in 1989 in Argentina with Deportivo Paraguayo of Argentina, where he scored 28 goals.  A move to El Porvenir for the 1990 season did not prove successful, as a leg injury kept him out most of the season, and he moved to Nacional of Uruguay the next season, where he won the Uruguayan Championship in 1992. In the next year, he won the Chilean Cup championship with Unión Española.

Dely Valdés then moved to the Japan Football League, where he played with Toshiba. In his first season, 1993, he led the Japan Football scoring table with 20 goals, and improved that in 1994, again leading the league with 34. Delys Valdés was transferred to Cerezo Osaka for the 1995 season, and continued his dominance, scoring 19 goals. In the subsequent season he moved to Tosu Futures, where he scored 24 goals. For the 1998 season, Dely Valdés was signed by a Japan Football League club, Consadole Sapporo, looking to return to the first division; Jorge helped the team do just that, by scoring 40 goals in leading the team back. Dely Valdés remained with Sapporo in 1999, scoring 20 goals that season. He left them after the 1998 season.

Dely Valdés returned to CONCACAF following the 1999 J. League season to play in Major League Soccer for the Colorado Rapids. Dely Valdés continued his scoring rate in the 1999 MLS season, registering 10 goals and 6 assists in 32 games for the Rapids. He continued to score in 2000, registering another 7 goals and 1 assist in 20 games, 13 starts, for the Rapids.

He returned to Japan to play for Omiya Ardija alongside compatriot Alfredo Anderson and joined Kawasaki Frontale in 2003.

International career 
Jorge was a very dangerous striker for the Panama national team for over a decade, playing 27 games with the team in the 1994, 1998, 2002 and 2006 World Cup Qualifying cycles. He made his debut in a May 1991 UNCAF Nations Cup match against Honduras and earned a total of 48 caps, scoring 19 goals. He represented his country at the 1995 and 2001 UNCAF Nations Cups.

In the Gold Cup of 2005, he scored two goals and led Panama to the final match against the United States.

His final international was an October 2005 FIFA World Cup qualification match against the United States.

Managerial career 
On August 8, 2014, he took over as manager at Tauro in his native Panama, a position he held until leaving on December 30, 2014 to join his brother Julio at Águila in El Salvador. He returned to Tauro in May 2015, only to be replaced by Rolando Palma in October 2015.

As coach of U-20 Panama, he managed to write history for the country by helping the national team to win the first ever match in the FIFA U-20 World Cup, a 2–1 victory over Asian champions U-20 Saudi Arabia in 2019 FIFA U-20 World Cup and qualified to the round of sixteen for the first time ever in Panamanian history of the U-20 World Cup.

Career statistics

International

International goals 
Scores and results list Panama's goal tally first.

Honours 
Unión Española
 Copa Chile: 1992

Individual
 CONCACAF Gold Cup Best XI (Honorable Mention): 2005

References

External links 

 
 What Ever Happened To: Jorge Dely Valdés – MLS Soccer
 ferplei.com

1967 births
Living people
Sportspeople from Colón, Panama
Panamanian twins
Twin sportspeople
Association football forwards
Panamanian footballers
Panama international footballers
2001 UNCAF Nations Cup players
2005 CONCACAF Gold Cup players
Central Norte players
Deportivo Paraguayo footballers
El Porvenir footballers
Club Nacional de Football players
Unión Española footballers
Hokkaido Consadole Sapporo players
Cerezo Osaka players
Sagan Tosu players
Colorado Rapids players
Omiya Ardija players
Kawasaki Frontale players
C.D. Árabe Unido players
Panamanian expatriate footballers
Expatriate footballers in Argentina
Expatriate footballers in Uruguay
Expatriate footballers in Chile
Expatriate footballers in Japan
Expatriate soccer players in the United States
Panamanian expatriate sportspeople in Japan
Panamanian expatriate sportspeople in Chile
J1 League players
J2 League players
Japan Football League (1992–1998) players
Major League Soccer players
Panama national football team managers
Panamanian football managers
Tauro F.C. managers
Liga Panameña de Fútbol players